Les Bordes is a commune in the Loiret department in north-central France. It is the site of Les Bordes golf course, ranked the number one golf course in Europe and in the top 10 courses in the world.

Population

Golf course
Originally conceived by Baron Marcel Bich of Bic pens and razors fame, the Les Bordes golf course is built on what was previously his  hunting estate. The Les Bordes golf course was the first course designed and built in France by Robert von Hagge.

The Les Bordes Estate was taken over by an affiliate of RoundShield Partners in 2018. Since then, a fully private golf club with an international membership has been established. Six Senses Hotels also recently announced the projected opening of a luxury hotel (completely separate from the golf club) on the estate in 2022. A multitude of other non-golf amenities are also planned to complete in the near term.

A second 18-hole golf course and a 10-hole par three course designed by Gil Hanse are currently being built at Les Bordes. Both will be additions to the private golf club facilities.

See also
Communes of the Loiret department

References

External links

Official site

Communes of Loiret